"Everybody Works but Father" is a popular song published in 1905, with words and music by Jean Havez. It is sung from the point of view of the son, lamenting that he, his sister and his mother all work, while his father lounges all day: "Everybody works at our house but my old man."

The song was sufficiently popular that it inspired a "sequel" titled "Uncle Quit Work Too", about a mooching relative who "sits around the house with about a half a souse and he never does a doggone thing."

Another inspired sequel was "Father's Got a Job", recorded by Maidie Scott.

It was recorded by artists of the day including Billy Murray. It was in the repertoire of Groucho Marx, who would include the song with a segment he performed about fathers.

References

External links
One of Billy Murray's recordings of the song

Songs about labor
Songs about fathers
1905 songs
Billy Murray (singer) songs
Songs written by Jean Havez